Raymond William (Raimundo Guillermo) was born in Durban, France. He entered the Canons Regular and in 1104 was appointed Bishop of Barbastro in Spain, remaining in that position until his death of natural causes in 1126.
He was canonised by Innocent II in 1136.

Notes

Spanish Roman Catholic saints
French Roman Catholic saints
12th-century Christian saints
12th-century Roman Catholic bishops in Spain
1126 deaths
Augustinian canons
Year of birth unknown